"Money Trees Deuce" is a song by American hip hop recording artist Jay Rock, released as the first single from his second studio album, 90059 (2015). The song, produced by Flippa and J Proof, is a follow-up to Kendrick Lamar's 2012 song, "Money Trees" featuring Jay Rock. It features vocals by Lance Skiiiwalker.

Track listing
 Digital download
 "Money Trees Deuce" – 5:21

Charts

References

2015 songs
2015 singles
Top Dawg Entertainment singles
Sequel songs
Jay Rock songs
Gangsta rap songs
Songs written by Jay Rock